"Wants and Needs" is a song by Canadian rapper Drake, featuring vocals from American rapper Lil Baby. It was released as the second out of three tracks from Drake's fourth extended play, Scary Hours 2, through Republic Records and OVO Sound, on March 5, 2021. The two artists wrote the song alongside producers Cardo, Dez Wright, and 40. The song debuted at number 2 on the Billboard Hot 100. making it Lil Baby's highest charting single on the Hot 100, eventually becoming tied with a future Drake and Lil Baby collaboration, "Girls Want Girls".

Background
The song serves as the fourth collaboration between Drake and Lil Baby, following 2018's collaborative singles "Yes Indeed" and "Never Recover", the latter alongside Gunna, plus the two artists' features alongside DaBaby on the remix of Future's 2020 single "Life Is Good", in which Drake is also featured on the original version.

It also received attention due to speculations of Drake slept with American model and media personality Kim Kardashian, the wife of American rapper Kanye West. Drake and West's feud has been dating back to multiple issues starting from around 2010.

Critical reception
Jordan Rose of Variety felt that "Lil Baby steals the show" with "Drake taking a back seat after delivering a verse with a purposefully offbeat flow as Lil Baby takes over in the second act and absolutely bodies his guest appearance" and the song "was just a Lil Baby exposition, with the Atlanta rapper proving that he still has plenty in the tank after scorching 2020".

Personnel
Credits adapted from Tidal.

 Drake – 
Featured vocals, songwriting
 Dion Tyrell Martin-Facey – lead song direction,
lead vocals, songwriting
 Lil Baby – featured vocals, songwriting
 Cardo – production, songwriting
 Dez Wright – production, songwriting
 40 – production, songwriting, mixing, studio personnel
 Noel Cadastre – recording, studio personnel

Charts

Weekly charts

Year-end charts

Certifications

References

2021 songs
Drake (musician) songs
Lil Baby songs
Songs written by Drake (musician)
Songs written by Lil Baby
Song recordings produced by Cardo (record producer)
Song recordings produced by 40 (record producer)